Muhammad Umar Babrakzai ( 1980 – present) is the tribal chief of the Zadran tribe and Afghan jurist.

Background and early life 
Babrakzai is the grandson of Babrak Khan, a previous Zadran chieftain who died in 1924 or 1925, though it's unclear through what father.

It is unknown who preceded Babrakzai as chieftain. It was possibly Abdulla Khan Jadran Yawan, who was chieftain as of 1969, although it's unclear if Babrakzai was Abdulla's immediate successor or if someone else was chieftain between them.

At some point, Babrakzai moved to France where he received an education. Upon returning to Afghanistan, he became part of Kingdom of Afghanistan's elite. At some point after King Mohammed Zahir Shah initiated a period of democratic reforms with the 1964 constitution, Babrakzai served as Supreme Court justice.

Tribal chief 

Babrakzai opposed the Soviet invasion of Afghanistan in 1979. The authors of Out of Afghanistan describe him as being the "prime mover" of the initial Afghan resistance, due to him forming a "national council" to map out an Afghan response. He joined the National Islamic Front of Afghanistan, became the chairman of a pro-resistance loya jirga, and also organized a jirga in Peshawar. In addition, Babrakzai maintained contacts with France during this period, and helped French activists to set up a International People's Tribunal in Paris.

Babrakzai continued to resist the Soviets during the rest of the Soviet–Afghan War. In 1983, he attended a meeting with US president Ronald Reagan. An image of this meeting later became an internet meme, where Babrakzai and other members of the meeting were falsely described as Taliban officials, even though the Taliban had not been formed yet by that time.  Despite his regional influence, however, Babrakzai had little control over the militants in his tribal territories, over whom Jalaluddin Haqqani gained more control. 

Babrakzai continues to be tribal chief as of 2019.

Family

References 

Afghan rebels
Pashtun people
Afghan chiefs